The Spahi class consisted of seven destroyers built for the French Navy in the first decade of the 20th century. One ship was lost during the First World War, but the others survived to be scrapped afterwards.

Design and description
The Spahi-class was over 50 percent larger than the preceding  to match the increase in size of foreign destroyers. They varied slightly in size due to building practices of each shipyard.
The ships displaced  at deep load.

The destroyers were powered by two triple-expansion steam engines, each driving one propeller shaft using steam provided by four water-tube boilers of three different types.  and  used Normand boilers,  and  had du Temple boilers while the remaining three ships were fitted with Guyot boilers.

The primary armament of the Spahi-class ships consisted of six  Modèle 1902 guns in single mounts, one each fore and aft of the superstructure and the others were distributed amidships. They were also fitted with three  torpedo tubes. One of these was in a fixed mount in the bow and the other two were on single rotating mounts amidships.

Ships

Citations

Bibliography

 
 
 

 
Destroyer classes
Destroyers of the French Navy
 
Ship classes of the French Navy